The secretary of health (Filipino: Kalihim ng Kalusugan) is the Cabinet of the Philippines member who is in charge of the Department of Health. The secretary of health is also the ex-officio chairperson of the Philippine Health Insurance Corporation (PhilHealth).

List of secretaries of health

References

 
Health